Delias totila is a butterfly in the family Pieridae. It was described by Karl Borromaeus Maria Josef Heller in 1896. It is endemic to New Britain.

References

External links

Delias at Markku Savela's Lepidoptera and Some Other Life Forms

totila
Butterflies described in 1896